Olga Đoković (born 8 January 1945  in Sarajevo, SFR Yugoslavia) is a Yugoslavian former female basketball player.

References

External links
Biography

1945 births
Living people
Basketball players from Sarajevo
Yugoslav women's basketball players
Bosnia and Herzegovina women's basketball players
Serbian women's basketball players
Serbs of Bosnia and Herzegovina